Jorge Molina (born 3 April 1956) is a Colombian sports shooter. He competed at the 1984 Summer Olympics and the 1988 Summer Olympics.

References

1956 births
Living people
Colombian male sport shooters
Olympic shooters of Colombia
Shooters at the 1984 Summer Olympics
Shooters at the 1988 Summer Olympics
Place of birth missing (living people)
20th-century Colombian people